Gospel of the Horns was an Australian black metal band that was formed in 1993 by vocalist Shane Transvaal D (of Deinonychus) and Mark Howitzer. Originating from Brisbane, the band released 2 EPs and 2 full-length albums.

History 
Gospel of the Horns formed in 1993, consisting of Mark Howitzer (drums), Shane Transvaal D (vocals) (who died in 2011) and original bassist, Anton (who never recorded with the band) and later, Hellbutcher joined (guitars, bass). In late 1994 the band released their first tape demo, The Satanist's Dream, which led to a record deal with Einstand Records. The label intended to press the demo to CD, but the final product contained many mistakes, such as incorrect layouts and a photo of another band in the booklet. To this day, the band refuses to include the CD version of the demo in their discography, because of the aforementioned mistakes by the record label.

In 1995, the band played their one and only show with the original line up including Vulture on drums opening for Misery at the Roxy Club. Vulture later appeared on their two track demo but was never credited. In 1996, Shane was fired due to issues within the group bringing an end to the Brisbane chapter of the band. Founding member Mark Howitzer relocated to Melbourne. For a period of time, he played drums for fellow black metallers Deströyer 666, even featuring on their 1997 album, Unchain the Wolves.

1997 saw Gospel of the Horns reform under Howitzer's guidance. The 1997 line-up consisted of Howitzer on vocals (and handling all lyrical matters), Ryan Marauder on guitar, and Warhammer playing drums. In May 1998 the band's second demo, Sinners, was recorded and released independently. At this stage, the band decided to sign a deal with Dutch label, Damnation Records, that would include a mini-LP and full-length release.

Shortly after the release of Sinners, Warhammer was replaced by Obliterator. A deal with the record label Morbid Productions resulted in the release of the 7-inch EP Monuments of Impurity. The EP contains three tracks, of which one is a cover of the Mortal Sin song "Blood, Death, Hatred".

Following the release of their first EP, in 1999 Obliterator was replaced by ex-Bestial Warlust drummer, Hellcunt. A year later, Gospel of the Horns had material to record their mini-LP, Eve of the Conqueror through Damnation Records. In July to August 2000, the band embarked on their first tour of Europe, playing alongside bands such as Pentacle, Enthroned, Primordial, and Thus Defiled. Countries included in the tour were the Netherlands, France, Belgium, England, and Ireland. The band also participated in the Stonehenge Festival in the Netherlands.

Returning from the European tour, the band recruited a second guitarist, Chris Masochist. In September 2001, the band recorded their follow-up LP, A Call to Arms, at St. Andrews Studio. However, due to financial problems, the band could not fulfill their deal with Damnation Records, and so the album was released through Invictus Productions.

In June 2005, Marauder left to start his own band, Funerary Pit. An Australian tour for Gospel of the Horns with Swedish band Dismember followed. In 2006, Trench Hell guitarist, Hexx, joined the band. In 2007 the next full-length album Realm of the Damned was released.

In January 2007 the band split up, but reformed two weeks later. The new line-up was essentially the same except for Marauder's rejoining and Hexx's departure. In June 2008 the band performed in Seattle. In September 2009 Gospel of the Horns played their "last ever shows in Europe" in the Netherlands, Germany and Ireland (Dublin).

Though the band had announced that they will play their last show on 7 December 2008, supporting Swedish death metal band Grave, at Melbourne's Corner Hotel, they performed alongside Japan's Coffins in September 2010 in their Melbourne live show.

Reception 
Elementalist described the band's early lyrical style as, "Gospel of the Horns' lyrical ideology confronts our most despised and traditional enemy and its conformist religion".

Archaic Magazine reviewer, Julian Klassen wrote, "Gospel of the Horns is another band that plays that typical Australian metal (plays this kind of music since 1993) and is definitively one of the bests in its genre (featuring members of Bestial Warlust)".

Members

Final Members
 Mark Howitzer – Bass, Vocals (1997–2007, 2007–2018), Drums (1993–1996)
 Chris Masochist – Guitar (2000–2007, 2007–2018)
 Chris Menning – Drums (2012–2018)

Former Members
 Rob "Death Dealer" Curry – Guitars, Bass (1993–1996)
 Shane "Transvaal D." Davidson – Vocals (1993–1996)
 "Vulture" - Drums (1994 -1996)
 Peter "Warhammer" Martin – Drums (1997–1998)
 Ryan Marauder – Guitar (1997–2005, 2007–2011)
 Shannon "Hexx" Hush – Guitar (2006–2007)
 Brett Murray – Drums (1998–1999)
 Marcus Hellcunt – Drums (1999–2007, 2007–2012)

Timeline

Discography

Studio albums

References

External links
Official Homepage

Musical groups established in 1993
Australian heavy metal musical groups
Australian thrash metal musical groups
Australian black metal musical groups
Musical groups from Brisbane
1993 establishments in Australia